The Germantown School District is a school district that serves the Village of Germantown, Wisconsin, the Town of Germantown, and the towns of Jackson, Polk, Richfield, Hubertus, the unincorporated community of Colgate. The district currently serves 3,939 students.

Each school in the district has a building leadership team and a Parent-Teacher Association to promote learning. Students are encouraged to participate in extra-curricular activities, including music, sports, and academic programs.  The district motto is "Empower and Inspire Every Student to Success".

Schools

Elementary schools
 Amy Belle Elementary School
 County Line Elementary School
 MacArthur Elementary School
 Rockfield Elementary School

Middle school
 Kennedy Middle School

High school
 Germantown High School

Elementary school referendum
Because of the overcrowding in the elementary schools, a referendum for building a new elementary school was on the April 1, 2008 ballot and was voted down. The option was again given to residents on November 4, but was voted down, with 58% of voters saying no because of tax hike fears.

References

External links
Germantown School District website

School districts in Wisconsin
Education in Washington County, Wisconsin